This is a list of Members of Parliament elected at the 1922 general election, held on 15 November. For a complete list of constituency elections results, see Constituency election results in the 1922 United Kingdom general election. Future Labour Prime Minister Clement Attlee was elected for the first time.



By elections
See the list of United Kingdom by-elections.

Sources

See also
UK general election, 1922
List of parliaments of the United Kingdom

1922
1922 United Kingdom general election
 List
UK MPs